Madison Brengle and Alexa Glatch were the defending champions, but both players chose not to participate.

Jan Abaza and Viktorija Golubic won the title, defeating Paula Cristina Gonçalves and Sanaz Marand in the final, 7–6(7–3), 7–5.

Seeds

Draw

Draw

References
Main Draw

USTA Tennis Classic of Macon - Doubles